Corinne Féret (born 17 September 1961) is a French politician. She represents the department of Calvados in the French Senate as a member of the Socialist Party. She was the first woman elected to the Senate for that department.

The daughter of Jean-Claude Féret, who worked for Électricité de France, and the granddaughter of a railway worker, she was born in the La Guérinière neighbourhood of Caen. She joined the Socialist Party in 1982. In 2008, she became first deputy for Caen mayor Philippe Duron. Féret was elected to the departmental council in March 2015. She was elected to the Senate in June 2015, replacing François Aubey who was removed from office by the Constitutional Council.

References 

1961 births
Living people
French Senators of the Fifth Republic
Socialist Party (France) politicians
21st-century French politicians
Politicians from Caen
Women members of the Senate (France)
21st-century French women politicians
Senators of Calvados (department)